Frying Pan (LV-115) is a lightvessel moored at Pier 66a in the Chelsea neighborhood of Manhattan in New York City.  It served at Frying Pan Shoals, off Cape Fear in North Carolina, for over 30 years.

Frying Pan Shoals station
In 1854, because of complaints from mariners that the height of the existing Bald Head Lighthouse was inadequate, and the light of its third-order Fresnel lens was not bright enough to warn mariners of the shallow waters of the treacherous Frying Pan Shoals off the coast of Cape Fear in North Carolina, United States, the first lightship was stationed on the shoals, in lieu of a proposal to improve Bald Point Lighthouse. The Bald Point lighthouse, and others, were turned off during the Civil War to avoid aiding the Northern ships. Lightships remained on station for 110 years.

On July 29, 1944, Lieutenant (jg) Clarence Samuels, USCG, became the first Hispanic-American of African descent to command a lightship when he assumed command of Frying Pan.

The ship was replaced by a lighttower in 1964. The lighttower, a Texas tower, was manned until 1979, is known as a diving spot and still stands.

Frying Pan was the last of nine ships that served in succession, with some alternation, at the Frying Pan Shoals station during and since the American Civil War.

Construction and features
LV-115 was built in 1929–1930 by Charleston Drydock & Machine Co. for a contract price of $274,434. The keel was laid January 30, 1929 with launch on August 30 and delivery on April 8, 1930. In addition to the light, horn and manually operated bell the vessel was equipped with radio, radio-beacon and submarine signal bell when built.

Service
Frying Pan served at Frying Pan Shoals from 1930 to 1942, and again from 1945 to 1964.  During World War II the ship was used as an examination vessel, as part of training.

Frying Pan was retired from duty at Frying Pan Shoals in 1964.  It served briefly as a relief ship at Cape May, New Jersey, and then was decommissioned in 1965. The ship sank in 1986.  It was raised in 1987, then resold and eventually restoration began in 1988.  It was listed on the National Register of Historic Places in 1999.

Frying Pan is one of about 13 surviving American lightships, out of about 100 built.  Four other lightships, Ambrose at South Street Seaport, Nantucket at Oyster Bay, Long Island, Chesapeake at Baltimore Inner Harbor and Swiftsure at Northwest Seaport became National Historic Landmarks and are open to the public as museum ships.

Party ship
Frying Pan can be rented for events and functions.  It became known as a party site in New York.

References

External links

Welcome Aboard the Lightship "Frying Pan"
Lightship Frying Pan, at North River Historic Ship Society
Bald Point Lighthouse describes 1854

National Register of Historic Places in New York City
Ships on the National Register of Historic Places in Manhattan
Lightships of the United States
Ships of the United States Lighthouse Service
Chelsea, Manhattan
Museum ships in New York (state)
1929 ships
Floating restaurants